The Immortal 32 was a relief force of thirty-two Texian Militia from the Gonzales Ranger Company who reinforced the Texians under siege at the Alamo. They are "immortalized" as the only unit to answer the To the People of Texas & All Americans in the World letter. Along with the other Alamo defenders, they were all killed and burned after the Battle of the Alamo.

Background 

As Santa Anna's army approached the Alamo February 19, 1836, William Travis dispatched John Johnson to Goliad for reinforcement from James Fannin. He also dispatched John Smith and Dr. James Sutherland to Gonzales with a letter for the Alcade Andrew Ponton:"The enemy in large force is in sight. We want men and provisions. Send them to us. We have 150 men and are determined to defend the Alamo to the last. Give us assistance."
William Barrett Travis

Lt. Col. Comdt.That night, Santa Anna sent General Ventura Mora's cavalry to encircle to the North and East corners of the Alamo to prevent the arrival of reinforcements.

On February 24, Travis dispatched Albert Martin to Gonzales with a second letter for Andrew Ponton:

Ponton received the first letter on February 24. He mobilized George Kimble, commander of the Texian Militia Gonzales Ranger Company, who mustered his unit and waited for Fannin; who also received the first letter on February 24. On February 26, Fannin departed Goliad for the Alamo with 320 men, 4 cannon, and several supply wagons. After repeated disasters, Fannin abandoned the mission and returned to Goliad. On February 27, Kimble departed with his unit for the Alamo.

Ponton received the second letter on February 27 and dispatched it to Governor Henry Smith in San Felipe. Smith informed colonists:

Travis dispatched his final letter to the President David G. Burnet on March 3:

History 

On February 29, 1836, the "Immortal 32" led by George Kimbell arrived at the Alamo. At 3:00 am on March 1, under the cover of night, they slipped through Santa Anna's lines and entered the fort. They are the only relief force to arrive before the final assault. On March 5, James Allen is the last Texian to leave the Alamo with a final dispatch from William Travis and various letters from the Alamo Defenders. A letter written by one of the thirty-two, Isaac Millsaps, details events inside the Alamo on the night before the final assault; its authenticity is disputed:

On March 6, the final assault of the siege, the Battle of the Alamo, commenced at 5:00 am. By 6:30 am, 257 of the 260 defenders, including all of the "Immortal 32", had been killed. Their bodies were stacked and burned.

The 32 
Sources

 George C. Kimble, 33, commander
 Albert Martin, 28 (also Old Eighteen)
 Isaac G. Baker, 21
 John Cain, 34
 George W. Cottle, 25 (brother of an Old Eighteen)
 David P. Cummins, 27
 Jacob C. Darst, 42 (also Old Eighteen)
 John Davis, 25
 Squire Daymon, 28
 William Dearduff, 19
 Charles Despallier/ Espalier, 24
 Almaron Dickinson (also Old Eighteen)
 William Fishbaugh
 John Flanders, 36
 Dolphin Ward Floyd, 32
 Galva Fuqua, 16
 John E. Garvin, about 40
 John E. Gaston, 17
 James George, 34
 Thomas Jackson (also Old Eighteen)
 John Benjamin Kellogg II, 19
 Andrew Kent, 44
 William Philip King, 16
 Jonathan L. Lindley, 22
 Jesse McCoy, 32
 Thomas R. Miller, 40 (also Old Eighteen)
 Isaac Millsaps, 41
 George Neggan, 28
 William E. Summers, 24
 George W. Tumlinson, 22
 Robert White, 30
 Claiborne Wright, 26

Other individual Texians who answered Travis' letter and died at the Alamo: Daniel Bourne, 26; George Brown, 35; Jerry C. Day, 20; Andrew Duvalt, 32; John Harris, 23; William J. Lightfoot, 25; Marcus L. Sewell, 31; Amos Pollard, 33

Etymology 
The origin of Immortal 32 is disputed. It was likely coined and came into popular use after the release of The Immortal Alamo in 1911.

Legacy

Centennial Monument 

The Gonzales Memorial Museum was dedicated in 1936 for the Texas Centennial. Among its exhibits is The Immortal 32 Centennial Monument, a tall tapered shaft of pink Texas granite with a bronze sculpture by Raoul Josset. The sculpture depicts an allegorical figure supporting the Alamo above his head. Two flagpoles flank the sculpture. It is located at the end of the 104' reflection pool.

National Register 
The monument was added the National Register of Historic Places (#03001414) on January 13, 2004.

Legislation 

 On March 6, 2018, a commemoration of Immortal Albert Martin was established by Representatives John J. Lombardi, Raymond A. Hull, Antonio Giarrusso, Marvin L. Abney, and Arthur J. Corvese in House Resolution #7942 and authorized by the Rhode Island House of Representatives.

Markers 

 The Immortal 32 Centennial Monument received a Historical Marker (#2624) by the Texas Historical Commission in 1936:

 Immortal William E. Summers received a Historical Marker (#17286) by the Texas Historical Commission in 2012:

Namesakes 

Floyd County is named for Immortal Dolphin Ward Floyd
Kent County is named for Immortal Andrew Kent
Kimble County is named for Immortal George Kimble
King County is named for Immortal William Philip King
Cottle County is named for Immortal George W. Cottle

Portrayal in media 

 1911: The Immortal Alamo, a silent feature film based on the Battle of the Alamo.
 1915: Martyrs of the Alamo, a feature film based on the Siege of Béxar, Battle of the Alamo, and Battle of San Jacinto.
 1937: Heroes of the Alamo, is a low-budget filmed Texas Revolution and the Battle of the Alamo.
 1955: Davy Crockett, King of the Wild Frontier, a feature film based on Davy Crockett at the Battle of the Alamo.
 1955: The Last Command, a feature film based on Jim Bowie and the Battle of the Alamo.
 1960: The Alamo, a feature film based on the Battle of the Alamo.
 1987: The Alamo: 13 Days to Glory, a 3-hour miniseries based on the Battle of the Alamo
 2004: The Alamo, a feature film based on the Battle of the Alamo.
Immortal Almaron Dickinson portrayed by Stephen Bruton
Immortal Isaac Millsaps portrayed by Turk Pipkin
 2015: Texas Rising, a 10-hour miniseries based on the Texas Revolution.
 2018: The Men Who Built America: Frontiersmen ("Empire or Liberty"), an episode based on the Battle of the Alamo.

See also 

Old Eighteen
Texian Militia

 Texas Military Forces
 Texas Military Department
 List of conflicts involving the Texas Military
 Awards and decorations of the Texas Military

References 

Texas Revolution
Texas Military Forces
Texas Military Department